Wrightstown Friends Meeting Complex is a historic Quaker meeting house on PA 413 in Wrightstown, Pennsylvania. Quaker activity in Wrightstown dates back to at least 1685.  A log meetinghouse was built on the present site in 1708 and expanded in 1735 and 1737.  A stone wall from the 1737 expansion was increased in height to two stories in 1787 as the present meetinghouse was built immediately to the north of the old meetinghouse.

Edward Hicks, painter of The Peaceable Kingdom, attended this meeting from 1814 to 1820.

The meetinghouse was added to the National Register in 1975.

References

External links
Wrightstown Friends Meeting
Wrightstown Friends Nursery School
RECORDS OF WRIGHTSTOWN MONTHLY MEETING (WRIGHTSTOWN, PA.) available on microfilm at Swarthmore College and Haverford College libraries.

Quaker meeting houses in Pennsylvania
Churches on the National Register of Historic Places in Pennsylvania
Churches completed in 1787
Churches in Bucks County, Pennsylvania
1787 establishments in Pennsylvania
18th-century Quaker meeting houses
National Register of Historic Places in Bucks County, Pennsylvania